Paul Joseph Busiek (April 1, 1923 – April 18, 2016) was an American doctor and politician who served in the Missouri House of Representatives. Busiek attended Drury College and Washington University in St. Louis, earning his medical degree at the latter. He did an internship in Rochester, New York and at a children's hospital in St. Louis before opening up a private practice in Springfield, Missouri. Busiek was elected to the Missouri House of Representatives in 1976 and served one term, retiring in 1978.

References

1923 births
2016 deaths
Politicians from Springfield, Missouri
Drury University alumni
Washington University School of Medicine alumni
Physicians from Missouri
Republican Party members of the Missouri House of Representatives
20th-century American politicians